The qualification event of the 2015 World Wheelchair Curling Championship was held from November 1 to 6, 2014 at the Lillehammer Curling Club in Lillehammer, Norway. The qualification event was open to any World Curling Federation member nation not already qualified for the World Championship. The event's two top finishers, Norway and Germany, will join the top eight finishers from the last World Wheelchair Curling Championship at this season's event in Lohja, Finland.

This event would have marked the first appearance of Israel at an international wheelchair curling event, but Israel was deemed ineligible to play due to an inability to meet classification criteria.

Teams

Round-robin standings
Final round-robin standings

Round-robin results

Draw 1
Saturday, November 1, 15:30

Draw 2
Sunday, November 2, 10:00

Draw 3
Sunday, November 2, 16:00

Draw 4
Monday, November 3, 10:00

Draw 5
Monday, November 3, 14:00

Draw 6
Monday, November 3, 18:00

Draw 7
Tuesday, November 4, 10:00

Draw 8
Tuesday, November 4, 16:00

Draw 9
Wednesday, November 5, 10:00

Draw 10
Wednesday, November 5, 14:00

Playoffs

R1 vs. B1
Thursday, November 6, 10:00

 advances to World Championship.
 goes to Second Place Game.

R2 vs. B2
Thursday, November 6, 10:00

 advances to Second Place Game.

Second Place Game
Thursday, November 6, 15:00

 advances to World Championship.

References

External links

2014 in curling
Qualification for curling competitions
World Wheelchair Curling Championship